Manuel "Mannie" Johern Rass (born 19 April 1998) is a South African rugby union player for the  in Super Rugby, the  in the Currie Cup and the  in the Rugby Challenge. His regular position is centre.

References

External links
itsrugby.co.uk profile
ultimaterugby.com profile
sarugby.co.za profile
worldrugby.com squad

South African rugby union players
Living people
1998 births
People from Somerset West
Rugby union centres
Golden Lions players
Lions (United Rugby Championship) players
Rugby union players from the Western Cape